Matthias Diependaele (born 7 Augustus 1979 in Sint-Niklaas) is a Belgian politician affiliated to the N-VA who is the current Minister for Finance, Budget, Housing and Immovable Heritage in the Flemish Government. He previously served as a member of the Flemish Parliament between 2009 and 2019.

Career 

In 2006, he graduated with a law degree from the KU Leuven, having specialized himself in European and international law. He started his political career within the N-VA as a parliamentary aide to MEP Frieda Brepoels. In the 2009 regional elections, at the age of 29, he was elected as a member of the Flemish parliament. In 2013, Diependaele became the parliamentary leader for the N-VA in the Flemish parliament, succeeding Kris Van Dijck.

In the 2012 local elections, Diependaele was the lead candidate for the N-VA-ZAP list in his home town Zottegem and was elected as a municipal councillor. Despite his party gaining the largest share of the vote, it was excluded from the governing coalition and ended up in opposition. After the 2018 local elections, the N-VA formed a new coalition with CD&V and Diependaele was appointed as an alderman tasked with traffic, mobility, public works, spatial planning, submunicipalities and animal welfare. As part of the coalition agreement, it was decided that Diependaele would take over as mayor at the start of 2022.

He was reelected as a member of the Flemish parliament in the 2014 and 2019 regional elections. On 2 October 2019, Diependaele became the Minister for Finance, Budget, Housing and Immovable Heritage in the new Jambon Government. As required by law, he resigned from his position as an alderman in Zottegem at the same time. However, he will still take up his mandate as mayor of Zottegem at the start of 2022. He was succeeded as parliamentary leader by Wilfried Vandaele.

Notes

External links

Living people
Members of the Flemish Parliament
New Flemish Alliance politicians
1979 births
People from Sint-Niklaas
21st-century Belgian politicians